Squash competitions at the 2023 Pan American Games in Santiago, Chile are scheduled to be held at the Centro de Entrenamiento del Tenis y Deportes de Raqueta.

7 medal events are scheduled to be contested, a singles, doubles and team event for each gender along with a mixed doubles event.

Qualification

A total of 50 squash athletes (25 men and 25 women) will qualify to compete. Each nation may enter a maximum of 6 athletes (three per gender), except for the NOCs that have qualified in Cali 2021. The host nation, Chile automatically qualified the maximum team size. Other seven men's and women's teams (of three athletes) will qualify through different qualification tournaments.

Participating nations
A total of 3 countries qualified athletes.

Medalists

Men's events

Women's events

Mixed events

References

 
Events at the 2023 Pan American Games
Pan American Games
2023